Frans Van Dessel (9 May 1911 – 3 June 1986) was a Belgian footballer. He played in one match for the Belgium national football team in 1934.

References

External links
 

1911 births
1986 deaths
Belgian footballers
Belgium international footballers
Place of birth missing
Association football defenders